Marry, or Do Worse is a 1703 comedy play by William Walker.

It premiered at the Lincoln's Inn Fields Theatre in London. The original cast is not known.

References

Bibliography
 Burling, William J. A Checklist of New Plays and Entertainments on the London Stage, 1700-1737. Fairleigh Dickinson Univ Press, 1992.
 Nicoll, Allardyce. History of English Drama, 1660-1900, Volume 2. Cambridge University Press, 2009.

1703 plays
English plays
West End plays
Comedy plays